John Joseph "Jack" Conway (26 March 1867 – 22 October 1949) was an Australian rules footballer who played for the Geelong Football Club in the Victorian Football League (VFL).

Family
Jack married Mary Catherine "Polly" Doloughty and had five children from 1899 to 1915.

Football
He was Geelong's first captain in the VFL, captaining the club for its first three seasons in the new competition before retiring at the end of the 1899 season. He is also notable for being in the inaugural team for Geelong in the VFL, and is credited with being the first player selected for a Geelong team.

See also
 The Footballers' Alphabet

Notes

References
 'Follower', "The Footballers' Alphabet", The Leader, (Saturday, 23 July 1898), p.17.

External links

1867 births
Geelong Football Club (VFA) players
Geelong Football Club players
Australian rules footballers from Geelong
1949 deaths